The 1991 Asian Badminton Championships was the 10th tournament of the Asian Badminton Championships. It was held in Cheras Indoor Stadium, in Kuala lumpur, Malaysia, from 20 to 24 February 1991.

Medalists

Medal table

Finals

Semifinals

References

External links 
 Tournament link at www.tournamentsoftware.com
 About the Asian Badminton Championships at www.badmintoncentral.com

Badminton Asia Championships
Asian Badminton Championships
1991 Badminton Asia Championships
Badminton Asia Championships
Badminton Asia Championships